Rockaway Valley Methodist Church is a historic church located on Valley Road, northwest of Boonton, in Boonton Township of Morris County, New Jersey.

It was built in 1842 and added to the New Jersey Register of Historic Places in 1976. The next year, in 1977, it was added to the National Register.

See also
 National Register of Historic Places listings in Morris County, New Jersey

References

Boonton Township, New Jersey
Methodist churches in New Jersey
Churches on the National Register of Historic Places in New Jersey
Churches completed in 1842
Churches in Morris County, New Jersey
National Register of Historic Places in Morris County, New Jersey
New Jersey Register of Historic Places